Buster's Bedroom is a 1990 independent German comedy film directed by Rebecca Horn. The film follows a young woman with an infatuation for Buster Keaton. The film was shown at the Marché du Film of the Cannes Film Festival in May 1990. Later that year it was shown at the Museum of Contemporary Art, Los Angeles together with Horn's exhibition. The objects of the exhibition were connected to the film, as themes, character references and props. The film was released in Germany on 9 May 1991. The film stars Amanda Ooms, Donald Sutherland and Geraldine Chaplin.

Plot
A dreamy-eyed young woman, Micha (Ooms), is intent on immersing herself in the life and work of her icon, the comic actor, Buster Keaton. Micha soon finds herself in Santa Barbara at Nirvana House, a large, mostly abandoned villa. The residents are a strange group of characters that appear to inhabit lives outside of real time. Nirvana House is also the location where Keaton himself frequented over his alcohol problems and was even detained in a straitjacket in the villa. Micha shares this history in common with her idol when she is also placed in a straitjacket but manages to escape.

At Nirvana House, Micha meets Dr. O'Connor (Sutherland), who heads the operation and has a penchant for poisonous snakes. She also meets a bitter scotch-drinking ex-actress, Diana (Chaplin). Diana uses a wheelchair as the result of a psychosomatic ailment. Also at Nirvana House is Warlock (Warrilow), an asexual beekeeper entranced by pollination. Other residents of the facility include a crazed pianist and a sailor-obsessed middle-aged gardener.

Another resident is the former prima donna, Serafina (Cortese), who keeps butterflies in her icebox, who frequent an area of the sanatorium known as the Pavilion of Love to play dramatic scenes of welcoming back the Legionnaire, Joe (Wuttke) from the war. The pair sleep together only for Serafina to reject Joe in the morning, doubting his valiance alongside those who died at war, and pulling a fake trigger to his head. However things become dangerous when reality overcomes the fantasy of Nirvana House. This is especially true when Diana develops very jealous feelings over Micha's relationship with Dr. O'Connor.

Cast
Amanda Ooms as Micha
Donald Sutherland as Dr. O'Connor
Geraldine Chaplin as Diana Daniels
Valentina Cortese as Serafina Tannenbaum
David Warrilow as Mr. Warlock
Taylor Mead as James
Ari Snyder as Lenny Silver
Martin Wuttke as Joe
Mary Woronov as Jane
Nina Franoszek as Sue
Buster Keaton (Archive Footage)

Reception
Michael Brenson of The New York Times described the film as "largely convincing" and that "In mood and style, it has a touch of Fellini's magic, a touch of Visconti's decadence and a touch of Bunuel's liberating illogic. The film's narrative weaves together the objects in the exhibition. Its flow defines the artist's sensibility."

The film was nominated for the German Film Award for Best Fiction Film. The academy awarded Nina Von Hugo the award for Best Production Design.

References

External links
 

1990 films
1990s avant-garde and experimental films
German avant-garde and experimental films
West German films
English-language German films
Films set in the United States
Films shot in Germany
1990s German films